Carol Buchanan Royle (born 10 February 1954) is an English actress. She is best known for playing Jenny Russell in the BBC sitcom Life Without George (1987—1989) and Lady Patricia Brewster in Heartbeat (1997—2003).

Early life
Born in Blackpool the daughter of actor Derek Royle, Carol Royle studied drama at the Central School of Speech and Drama.

Career
Making her screen debut in 45 episodes of The Cedar Tree from 1977 to 1978, Royle went on to become known for her role as Jenny Russell in the BBC sitcom Life Without George which ran for three series from 1987 to 1989, as well as her role in ITV1's 1960s based drama Heartbeat, in which she played Austin Healey-driving Lady Patricia Brewster in four episodes. In 1989 she appeared in the prominent role of Jessica in Blackeyes written by Dennis Potter. Other television shows Royle has appeared in are Blake's 7, The Professionals, Bergerac, Hammer House of Mystery and Suspense, Cribb, Crossroads, The Outsider, Casualty, Ladies in Charge, Crime Traveller, The Bill, Doctors, and Father Brown. Her film career includes roles in The Greek Tycoon (1978) and Tuxedo Warrior (1982).

Since 2019, Royle played Mrs Bright in the Inspector Morse prequel Endeavour and appeared in five episodes of the series.

Personal life
She married Julian Spear, son of actor Bernard Spear, in 1977. They have two children, Taran and Talitha.

Her younger sister Amanda Royle is also an actress.

Filmography

Film

Television

References

External links
 
 
 

English soap opera actresses
People from Blackpool
Living people
1954 births